John Marmion (bef. 1519 – c. 1581) was a Member of Parliament for Cricklade, Wiltshire.

Career and life

He was the eldest son of Anthony Marmion of Adwell, Eastington and Upton St. Leonards, Gloucestershire and grandson of William Marmion, one of the MPs for Gloucester in 1491.

John was summoned to Parliament on 20 Jan 1558.

He became indebted to Sir Robert Doyley and was outlawed by 1581 and not heard of again.

References

Bibliography
 

Year of birth unknown
English MPs 1558
Members of the Parliament of England (pre-1707) for Cricklade
1581 deaths
Year of birth uncertain